Bryan Sola Zambrano (born April 3, 1992) is an Ecuadorian rower. He placed 28th in the men's single sculls event at the 2016 Summer Olympics.

References

1992 births
Living people
Ecuadorian male rowers
Olympic rowers of Ecuador
Rowers at the 2016 Summer Olympics